Charles Beauclerk may refer to:

 Charles Beauclerk, 1st Duke of St Albans (1670–1726), British peer
 Charles Beauclerk, 2nd Duke of St Albans (1696–1751), British peer
 Charles Beauclerk, 11th Duke of St Albans (1870–1934), British peer 
 Charles Beauclerk, 13th Duke of St Albans (1915–1988), British peer 
 Charles Beauclerk, Earl of Burford (born 1965), eldest son and heir apparent of the current Duke of St Albans
 Charles Sidney Beauclerk (1855–1934), Jesuit priest
 Charles William Beauclerk (1816–1863), English cricketer
 Charles George Beauclerk (1774–1845), British Member of Parliament